A 'Stayman' (or 'Stayman Winesap') is a triploid apple cultivar developed in 1866 by Joseph Stayman of Leavenworth County, Kansas; it was sold by nurseries from 1895. 'Stayman' apples remain a locally popular cultivar of apples where grown.

Characteristics
'Stayman' is a medium-sized, roundish-conic apple with a thick, greenish-yellow skin covered almost entirely with a deep red blush, darker red stripes, and russet dots. The stem cavity often shows heavy russetting. Firm, tender, finely textured, juicy, crisp, and yellowish-green, the flesh is tart and spicy. They keep very well, and are used primarily as dessert apples, but also make a fine addition to blended cider.

References

 Gardening and Horticulture. USDA.
 The History Of Weather Observing In Leavenworth, Kansas, 1827–2004.

External links
 Fall Recipes – FamilyFun
 Growing Apple Trees in the Home Garden – NC State University

Apple cultivars with patented mutants
Crops originating from the United States
Plants described in 1865
American apples
Apple cultivars